Discovery Limited is a South Africa-based financial services group that is listed on the Johannesburg Stock Exchange (JSE) with its headquarters in Sandton.

Overview 
Discovery Limited engages in long and short-term insurance, asset management, savings, investment, and employee benefits through its various brands. The Group has subsidiaries in South Africa, the United Kingdom, the United States, China, Singapore, and Australia.

History 
Discovery Limited was founded in 1992 by Adrian Gore and Barry Swartzberg. In the same year, RMB Holdings (RMBH) acquired a stake in the business by making Discovery Limited its subsidiary through Momentum Group (now part of MMI Holdings Limited). In 1998, the Momentum Group became part of First Rand after the merger of the financial services interests of Anglo American Corporation of South Africa Limited (now Anglo American plc) and RMBH to achieve the objective of a unified financial services grouping. With First Rand Group owning 75 percent of Discovery Limited.

Discovery Limited was successfully listed on the JSE in October 1999 through a successful initial public offering. During the year, First Rand Group reduced its stake in Discovery Limited to 64 percent. In 2003, Momentum Group Limited transferred its investment in Discovery Limited to FirstRand Limited for R740 million. In November 2007, FirstRand unbundled all of its entire shareholding in Discovery Limited and allotted the shares of Discovery Limited to its shareholders. This led to RMBH receiving a 25 percent direct stake in Discovery Limited, making it the single largest shareholder.

On 7 March 2011, RMBH, Remgro, and FirstRand spun off their insurance assets to Rand Merchant Insurance Holdings and separately listed it on the JSE. This restructure led to the transfer of RMBH's entire stake in Discovery Limited to RMI Holdings.

In September 2015, Discovery Limited announced its intention to set up a retail banking subsidiary with an initial $150 million investment.

In March 2019, Discovery Limited launched Discovery Bank, the world's first behavioural bank.

Member companies 

The companies that comprise Discovery Limited include, but are not limited to, the following: 
 Discovery Life – Sandton, South Africa – 100% Shareholding – Offering life and long term insurance products in South Africa. 
 Discovery Health – Sandton, South Africa – 100% Shareholding – Offering administration services to medical schemes and specialised medical insurance products in South Africa.
 Discovery Vitality – Sandton, South Africa – 100% Shareholding 
 Discovery Life Collective Investments – Sandton, South Africa – 100% Shareholding – Offering unit trusts
 Discovery Life Investment Services – Sandton, South Africa – 100% Shareholding – Offering unit trusts. 
 Discovery Insure – Sandton, South Africa – 100% Shareholding – Offering motor vehicle, household and other short-term risk insurance in South Africa. 
 VitalityHealth – London, United Kingdom – 100% Shareholding – Offering personal medical insurance products in the United Kingdom. 25% of the venture was previously held by Prudential Plc. 
 VitalityLife – London, United Kingdom – 100% Shareholding – Offering personal life and long term insurance products in the United Kingdom. 25% of the venture was previously held by Prudential Plc. 
 Vitality Corporate Services – London, United Kingdom – 100% Shareholding – Offering insurance products to both individuals and groups.
 The Vitality Group – Chicago, Illinois, US – 75% Shareholding – Offering insurance products to both individuals and groups. 
 AIA Vitality – Singapore – 50% Shareholding – Offering insurance products to both individuals and groups. A joint venture with the AIA Group Limited. 
 HumanaVitality – Louisville, Kentucky, US – 25% Shareholding – Offering insurance products to both individuals and groups. This is a subsidiary of New York Stock Exchange-listed Humana. 
 Ping An Health – Shenzhen, China – 25% Shareholding – Offering medical insurance products in China.

Ownership 
The shares of Discovery Limited are listed on the JSE. As of February 2015, the shareholding was as follows:

Governance 
The board of Discovery Limited is led by Hermanus Bosman as the chairman and Adrian Gore as the chief executive officer.

See also
 VitalityHealth
 MMI Holdings Limited
 OUTsurance Holdings
 Rand Merchant Investment Holdings
 First Rand
 List of companies traded on the JSE
 List of companies of South Africa
 Economy of South Africa

References

Companies based in Sandton
Insurance companies of South Africa
Financial services companies established in 1992
Companies listed on the Johannesburg Stock Exchange
Financial services companies of South Africa
South African companies established in 1992